Desisa is a genus of longhorn beetles of the subfamily Lamiinae, containing the following species:

subgenus Cylindrostyrax
 Desisa bhutanensis (Breuning, 1968)
 Desisa lunulata (Pascoe, 1885)
 Desisa lunulatoides Breuning, 1968
 Desisa marmorata Breuning, 1938
 Desisa quadriplagiata Breuning, 1938
 Desisa stramentosa Breuning & Itzinger, 1943
 Desisa takasagoana Matsushita, 1933
 Desisa undulatofasciata Breuning, 1938
 Desisa uniformis Breuning, 1938

subgenus Desisa
 Desisa celebensis Breuning, 1959
 Desisa chinensis Breuning, 1938
 Desisa dispersa Pic, 1944
 Desisa javanica Breuning, 1969
 Desisa kuraruana (Matsushita, 1935)
 Desisa lateplagiata Breuning, 1938
 Desisa luzonica Breuning, 1938
 Desisa malaccensis Breuning, 1938
 Desisa parvula Breuning, 1938
 Desisa subfasciata (Pascoe, 1862)
 Desisa variabilis (Schwarzer, 1925)
 Desisa variegata Breuning, 1938

subgenus Mesodesisa
 Desisa reseolata Breuning, 1974

References

Desisa